"Holidays" (sometimes erroneously called "Tones") is an instrumental by the American rock band the Beach Boys that was composed by Brian Wilson for their never-finished Smile album. In 2003, it was rewritten with new lyrics by Van Dyke Parks as "On a Holiday" for the project Brian Wilson Presents Smile (2004).

Recording
The original Beach Boys' version of "Holidays" was recorded on September 8, 1966 at Western studio. According to historian Keith Badman, the session marked the official start of the album's sessions, although other tracks had been recorded before then. It is one of the few pieces from Smile where every section was performed as part of one whole take.

In 1967, the Beach Boys recycled the piece's marimba melody for the Smiley Smile version of "Wind Chimes". These vocals were later mashed up into the version of "Holidays" that appears on The Smile Sessions (2011).

Wilson's 2004 version of "Holidays" contains mostly the same arrangement, albeit with new vocals. The hook of another Smile track, "Roll Plymouth Rock", was repeated in the chorus.

Lyrics
In a 2004 interview, Van Dyke Parks offered details about the lyrics he had recently penned for the song, now retitled "On a Holiday".

The line "lazy mister moon" alludes to the 1903 song "Lazy Moon", and "long, long ago" is a reference to the title of an 1833 text by Thomas Haynes Bayly that was recorded by Patti Page in 1951.

Reception
In the opinion of Consequence of Sound's Dean Essner, the original "has no vocals at all, allowing for the track’s wind instruments and marimbas to gorgeously swell at the front of the mix. But on Brian Wilson Presents SMiLE, Wilson sings a forgettable line about pirates, cluttering up the otherwise simple, feathery melody." PopMatters Sean Murphy characterized the song as a "Zappa-esque romp".

Bootleg discrepancies
Bootlegs of Smile sometimes mislabel the track as "Tones". A 1983 LP bootleg, referred to as the "Brother Records" Smile, included a track titled "Holidays", but was actually Miles Davis' "Here Come de Honey Man" (1959).

Personnel
Per band archivist Craig Slowinski.

The Beach Boys
Al Jardine – tag vocals
Mike Love – tag vocals
Brian Wilson – tag vocals
Carl Wilson – Fender bass, tag vocals
Dennis Wilson – drums, tag vocals

Guest
 Van Dyke Parks – piano with taped strings, overdubbed slidewhistle (uncertain credit)

Session musicians (later known as "the Wrecking Crew")

 Gary Coleman – marimba
 Gene Estes – marimba
 Sam Glenn, Jr. – clarinet, overdubbed flute
 Bill Green – clarinet, overdubbed flute
 Jim Horn – clarinet, overdubbed flute
 Jay Migliori – clarinet, overdubbed flute
 Chet Ricard – marimba

References

External links
 
 
 

2004 songs
Brian Wilson songs
Holiday songs
Songs written by Brian Wilson
Songs written by Van Dyke Parks